In computer science and cryptography, Whirlpool (sometimes styled WHIRLPOOL) is a cryptographic hash function. It was designed by Vincent Rijmen (co-creator of  the Advanced Encryption Standard) and Paulo S. L. M. Barreto, who first described it in 2000. 

The hash has been recommended by the NESSIE project. It has also been adopted by the International Organization for Standardization (ISO) and the International Electrotechnical Commission (IEC) as part of the joint ISO/IEC 10118-3 international standard.

Design features 

Whirlpool is a hash designed after the Square block cipher, and is considered to be in that family of block cipher functions. 

Whirlpool is a Miyaguchi-Preneel construction based on a substantially modified Advanced Encryption Standard (AES). 

Whirlpool takes a message of any length less than 2256 bits and returns a 512-bit message digest.

The authors have declared that
"WHIRLPOOL is not (and will never be) patented. It may be used free of charge for any purpose."

Version changes 
The original Whirlpool will be called Whirlpool-0, the first revision of Whirlpool will be called Whirlpool-T and the latest version will be called Whirlpool in the following test vectors.

 In the first revision in 2001, the S-box was changed from a randomly generated one with good cryptographic properties to one which has better cryptographic properties and is easier to implement in hardware.
 In the second revision (2003), a flaw in the diffusion matrix was found that lowered the estimated security of the algorithm below its potential. Changing the 8x8 rotating matrix constants from (1, 1, 3, 1, 5, 8, 9, 5) to (1, 1, 4, 1, 8, 5, 2, 9) solved this issue.

Internal structure 
The Whirlpool hash function is a Merkle–Damgård construction based on an AES-like block cipher W in Miyaguchi–Preneel mode. 

The block cipher W consists of an 8×8 state matrix  of bytes, for a total of 512 bits.

The encryption process consists of updating the state with four round functions over 10 rounds. The four round functions are SubBytes (SB), ShiftColumns (SC), MixRows (MR) and AddRoundKey (AK). During each round the new state is computed as
.

SubBytes 
The SubBytes operation applies a non-linear permutation (the S-box) to each byte of the state independently. The 8-bit S-box is composed of 3 smaller 4-bit S-boxes.

ShiftColumns 
The ShiftColumns operation cyclically shifts each byte in each column of the state. Column j has its bytes shifted downwards by j positions.

MixRows 
The matrix is chosen such that the branch number (an important property when looking at resistance to differential cryptanalysis) is 9, which is maximal.

AddRoundKey 
The AddRoundKey operation uses bitwise xor to add a key calculated by the key schedule to the current state. The key schedule is identical to the encryption itself, except the AddRoundKey function is replaced by an AddRoundConstant function that adds a predetermined constant in each round.

Whirlpool hashes 
The Whirlpool algorithm has undergone two revisions since its original 2000 specification.

People incorporating Whirlpool will most likely use the most recent revision of Whirlpool; while there are no known security weaknesses in earlier versions of Whirlpool, the most recent revision has better hardware implementation efficiency characteristics, and is also likely to be more secure. As mentioned earlier, it is also the version adopted in the ISO/IEC 10118-3 international standard.

The 512-bit (64-byte) Whirlpool hashes (also termed message digests) are typically represented as 128-digit hexadecimal numbers.
The following demonstrates a 43-byte ASCII input (not including quotes) and the corresponding Whirlpool hashes:

Even a small change in the message will (with an extremely high probability of ) result in a different hash, which will usually look completely different just like two unrelated random numbers do. The following demonstrates the result of changing the previous input by a single letter (a single bit, even, in ASCII-compatible encodings), replacing  with :

The hash of a zero-length string is:

Implementations 
The authors provide reference implementations of the Whirlpool algorithm, including a version written in C and a version written in Java. These reference implementations have been released into the public domain.

Adoption 
Two of the first widely used mainstream cryptographic programs that started using Whirlpool were FreeOTFE, followed by TrueCrypt in 2005.

VeraCrypt (a fork of TrueCrypt) included Whirlpool (the final version) as one of its supported hash algorithms.

See also 
 Digital timestamping

References

External links 
 
 , a Java implementation of all three revisions of Whirlpool
  – An open source Go implementation of the latest revision of Whirlpool
 A Matlab Implementation of the Whirlpool Hashing Function
 RHash, an open source command-line tool, which can calculate and verify Whirlpool hash.
 Perl Whirlpool module at CPAN
 Digest module implementing the Whirlpool hashing algorithm in Ruby
 Ironclad a Common Lisp cryptography package containing a Whirlpool implementation
 The ISO/IEC 10118-3:2004 standard
 Test vectors for the Whirlpool hash from the NESSIE project
 Managed C# implementation
 Python Whirlpool module

Cryptographic hash functions